The Syrian Premier League is a professional association football league in Syria and the top division in of the Syrian football league system. The league comprises 12 teams and operates on a system of promotion and relegation with the Syrian League 1st Division. The Syrian Premier League was founded in 1966, unifying the local leagues that had existed previously. Seasons mostly run from August to May.

The first team to win the title was Al-Ittihad in 1967, whilst Al-Jaish has the record with 17 league titles. Their closest rivals, Al-Karamah, have won the league 8 times.

In the beginning, the main tournament was the first division, then the SFA developed the competition in a historic step that allowed the participation of foreign players to turn the competition into a professional league.

Competition format

Competition
From the 2022–23 season, there are 12 clubs in the Premier League, instead of the previous 14. During the course of a season (usually from August or September to May) each club plays the others twice (a double round-robin system), once at their home stadium and once at that of their opponents; for 22 games. 

Teams receive three points for a win and one point for a draw. No points are awarded for a loss. Teams are ranked by total points, then goal difference, and then goals scored. If still equal, teams are deemed to occupy the same position. If there is a tie for the championship, for relegation, or for qualification to other competitions, a play-off match at a neutral venue decides rank.

Promotion and relegation
A system of promotion and relegation exists between the Syrian Premier League and the Syrian League 1st Division. The two lowest placed teams in Premier League are relegated to the League 1st Division, and the top two teams from the League 1st Division are promoted to the Premier League.

Number of teams

Qualification for Asian competitions

As of 7 December 2021

Qualification criteria for 2022 

At present, the winners of Syrian Premier League qualify for the AFC Champions League play-off, and the league runners-up qualify for the AFC Cup group stage alongside the winners of Syrian Cup.

If the cup winners are also the league winners or runners-up, the third-placed team in the league qualifies for the AFC Cup group stage. The winners of the AFC Champions League and AFC Cup may earn an additional qualification for the subsequent season's AFC Champions League qualifying play-offs if they have not already qualified.

The number of places allocated to the Syrian clubs in AFC competitions is dependent upon the position the country holds in the AFC Club Competitions Ranking, which is calculated based upon the performance of teams in AFC competitions in the previous four years.

Current clubs (2022–23)

Stadiums and locations

1:  Al-Karamah and Al-Wathba also use Bassel al-Assad  Stadium (25,000 seats) as a home stadium.

List of seasons
Champions so far are:

Performances

Performance by club

Performance by city

Doubles 
Five teams have won the double of the Syrian Premier League and the Syrian Cup in the same season.

Records and statistics

All seasons top goalscorers

All time top goalscorers
Last updated 17 December 2021 

Boldface indicates a player still active in Syrian Premier League.

League participation 

As of 2022, 35 clubs have participated. The tallies since its establishment in 1966 until the end of the 2021–22 season.

 50 seasons: Al-Ittihad SC Aleppo

Records
During 50 seasons, 10 teams won the league championship.
35 clubs have played in the league over the past 50 seasons, and the latest to join is Al-Horgela.
Al-Ittihad is the only club that has not missed out on participating in all editions of the tournament.
Al-Karama Club is the first team in the Syrian League to win the league championship 4 times in a row.
Al-Jaish team became the team that won the league championship 5 times in a row, as it managed to achieve the title seasons (2014-2015-2016-2017-2018).
The highest points average for the league champion: 64 points (Al-Karamah, 2007–2008 season).
The fastest goal in the history of the league was scored by Al-Majd player Samer Awad against Qardaha, the 2005-2006 season, after just 16 seconds.
The biggest goal difference in a single match was in the 1976-1977 season, when Al-Ittihad defeated Al-Nasr 14-0.
Coach Rifaat Al-Shamali holds the record for the longest training period, after training for Jableh SC for 17 consecutive seasons.
The only coach who won the league with two different clubs, is the late Zaki Natour with Al-Ittihad and Al-Shorta clubs.
The oldest player to participate in the league is Jamal Mao, at the age of 46 years with Al-Nidal Club.
The oldest player to score a goal in the league is Raed Kurdi at the age of 41, when he scored for his team Al-Jihad Club in 2018.

See also
Syrian Premier League top scorers
List of football stadiums in Syria
List of football clubs in Syria
Football in Syria

References

External links 
 League at FIFA
 League at soccerway.com
 Syrian Premier League - Hailoosport.com (Arabic)
 Syrian Premier League - Hailoosport.com

 
Syria
Sports leagues established in 1966
1966 establishments in Syria